was a village located in Tone District, northeastern Gunma Prefecture.

Geography 
River - Katashina River, 根利川、赤城川

History 
 April 1, 1889: due to the municipal status enforcement, the village of Akagine, Kitaseta District, was formed.
 April 1, 1896: due to the mergers between Kitaseta and Tone, the village became part of the Tone district.
 September 30, 1956: merged with the village of Azuma, Tone District, to form the village of Tone, Tone district.
 February 13. 2005: the village of Tone merged into the city of Numata.

Dissolved municipalities of Gunma Prefecture